is a passenger railway station  located in the city of Sanda, Hyōgo Prefecture, Japan. It is operated by the West Japan Railway Company (JR West).

Lines

Station layout
The station consists of two opposed ground-level side platforms connected to the station building by a footbridge. The station has a Midori no Madoguchi staffed ticket office.

Platforms

Adjacent stations

History
Aino Sation opened on 25 March 1899, as a station of Hankaku Railway, which was nationalized in 1907. With the privatization of the Japan National Railways (JNR) on 1 April 1987, the station came under the aegis of the West Japan Railway Company.

Station numbering was introduced in March 2018 with Aino being assigned station number JR-G64.

Passenger statistics
In fiscal 2016, the station was used by an average of 3548 passengers daily

Surrounding area
 Aino Hospital
Minatogawa College
 Sanda Matsusei High School

See also
List of railway stations in Japan

References

External links 

 Aino Station from JR-Odekake.net 

Railway stations in Hyōgo Prefecture
Railway stations in Japan opened in 1899
Sanda, Hyōgo